Breaker Morant is a 1980 Australian war drama film directed by Bruce Beresford, who co-wrote the screenplay based on Kenneth G. Ross's 1978 play of the same name.

The film concerns the 1902 court martial of lieutenants Harry Morant, Peter Handcock and George Witton—one of the first war crime prosecutions in British military history. Australians serving in the British Army during the Second Anglo-Boer War, Morant, Handcock, and Witton stood accused of murdering captured enemy combatants and an unarmed civilian in the Northern Transvaal. The film is notable for its exploration of the Nuremberg Defence, the politics of the death penalty and the human cost of total war. As the trial unfolds, the events in question are shown in flashbacks.

In 1980, the film won ten Australian Film Institute Awards including: Best Film, Best Direction, Leading Actor, Supporting Actor, Screenplay, Art Direction, Cinematography, and Editing. It was also nominated for the 1980 Academy Award for the Best Writing (Screenplay Based on Material from Another Medium).

Breaker Morant remains the movie with which Beresford is most identified and has "hoisted the images of the accused officers to the level of Australian icons and martyrs". In a 1999 interview Beresford explained that Breaker Morant "never pretended for a moment" that the defendants were not guilty as charged. He had intended the film to explore how wartime atrocities can be "committed by people who appear to be quite normal". Beresford concluded that he was "amazed" that so many people see his film as being about "poor Australians who were framed by the Brits".

Synopsis
In Pretoria, South Africa, in 1902, Major Charles Bolton (Rod Mullinar) is summoned to a meeting with Lord Kitchener (Alan Cassell). He is told that three officers of the Bushveldt Carbineers—lieutenants Harry Morant (Edward Woodward), Peter Handcock (Bryan Brown) and George Witton (Lewis Fitz-Gerald)—have been arrested and charged with the murder of captured Boers and a German missionary. Explaining ominously that the German Emperor—Wilhelm II—has protested diplomatically about the latter killing, Kitchener asks Major Bolton to appear for the prosecution. To the Major's visible dismay, he is told that witnesses who would help the defence have been sent to India and that the defence counsel is expected to give him no trouble.

The defence counsel, Major James Francis Thomas (Jack Thompson) meets Morant, Handcock and Witton the day before he is to represent them in court. He tells them that he knows only the basic facts, which look bad. A small town solicitor from New South Wales in civilian life, Major Thomas explains that he has never handled anything except legal documents like wills. Handcock quips, "Might come in handy".

As court martial proceedings begin the following morning, Major Thomas argues, because his clients are Australians, that only the Australian Army can court martial them. Unmoved, the president of the court martial, Lt. Col. Denny, explains that the defendants may be tried for alleged crimes committed while serving under British command in the Bushveldt Carbineers. Without further ado, Denny reads the indictment. The three stand accused of the murder of a Boer prisoner named Denys Visser (Michael Procanin Bernosky) and the subsequent shooting of six other captured Boers whose names are unknown. Morant and Handcock are charged with the murder of the Reverend Daniel Hesse.

Bolton begins by calling witnesses who describe a lack of discipline, drunkenness, widespread looting and corruption among the Carbineers at Fort Edward. Thomas manages to damage their credibility during cross-examination. The testimony then turns to the shooting of Visser, which is shown in flashback.

On 5 April 1901, Morant's friend, Captain Simon Hunt, had led a group of men to a farmhouse at Duiwelskloof intending to capture or kill Boer Commando Field Cornet Barend Viljoen. On arrival, the Carbineers found the farm swarming with far more armed men than expected. Captain Hunt was wounded, pinned down by enemy fire and left behind when he ordered his men to retreat. When the patrol returned to Fort Edward without Captain Hunt, Intelligence Corps Captain Alfred Taylor (John Waters) suggests Morant "avenge Captain Hunt". After returning to the farm and finding Captain Hunt's body mutilated with knives, Morant gave chase, ambushed Viljoen's men, and forced them to retreat with many losses. After capturing a Boer named Visser who was wearing Captain Hunt's jacket, an enraged Morant ordered his men to line up into a firing squad and shoot him. They obeyed his order.

Thomas argues that standing orders existed to shoot "all Boers captured wearing khaki". To the shock of Thomas and his clients, Bolton explains that those orders only applied to Boers wearing British uniforms as a ruse of war. When Morant takes the witness stand and is grilled by Bolton, he defends the shooting of Visser by saying that he fought the Boers as they fought him. When asked which of the rules of engagement justifies shooting an unarmed prisoner, Morant shouts, in reference to his rifle's calibre, saying they applied and shot them under "Rule 303". That night, Thomas tells Morant that he was the best witness the prosecution had, and that he should watch his temper. The following day, testimony turns to the shooting of the six Boers.

Captain Taylor testifies that Captain Hunt had paid a visit to Kitchener's headquarters. Following Hunt's return to Fort Edward, Morant had brought in a group of Boers who surrendered, only to be told by Captain Hunt that new orders received from Kitchener, relayed through Colonel Hubert Hamilton, decreed that no more prisoners were to be taken. Explaining that "The gentlemen's war is over", Hunt orders the prisoners to be shot, as Morant watched. Captain Taylor testifies that Morant had continued to bring prisoners in until after Captain Hunt had been killed. Afterwards, he always ordered his men to shoot them. On cross-examination, Bolton damages Taylor by forcing him to admit that he is also awaiting court martial for shooting prisoners. According to other witnesses, a group of six Boer guerrillas had approached Fort Edward after Captain Hunt's death, bearing white flags. Morant ordered the prisoners disarmed, lined up and shot. One charged Witton, who killed the prisoner with his revolver.

Thomas demands that Kitchener be summoned as a witness. He argues that, as his clients only followed orders, all charges must be dropped. Denny recoils at the suggestion that Kitchener, a man revered throughout the British Empire, would be capable of giving such criminal orders. Equally contemptuous of the idea, Bolton privately tells Thomas that, if Kitchener testifies and denies giving the orders, the defendants' lives will be doomed. He vainly urges Thomas not to insist. In private Kitchener tells Hamilton that, when he had issued orders to take no prisoners, he was trying to break the Boer guerrillas by waging total war. Now he is trying to win the hearts and minds of the Afrikaner people and arrange a peace conference. To this end, a few soldiers "have to be sacrificed" for the misdeeds of the British Army. He orders Hamilton to testify in his place. When Hamilton asks Kitchener what he should say, Kitchener replies, "I think you know what to say".

The following day, Hamilton takes the stand and denies ever having spoken to Captain Hunt. An outraged Morant stands up and shouts, calling the Colonel a liar. Denny comments that there will be no more talk of orders to shoot prisoners. Thomas explains that Hamilton's testimony is irrelevant. The fact is, his clients believed that such orders existed and thus cannot be held accountable for following them. The trial then turns to the murder of the Reverend Hesse. Corporal Sharp testifies that, shortly before the massacre of the six Boers, Hesse had passed through Fort Edward in a buggy. Shortly after his departure, Handcock had ridden up to Morant, spoken briefly to him and then ridden off, looking "agitated", in the same direction as Hesse, with a rifle. Thomas damages Sharp on cross-examination by revealing his hatred of the defendants.

On stand, Morant explains that Hesse was under orders to never speak to prisoners while passing through Fort Edward and violated them. When Bolton asks why such orders existed, Morant explains, "It was for security reasons". When Morant had confronted Hesse, he had been told that the prisoners had begged Hesse to pray with them and that he could not refuse. Hesse then left the fort and was later found, shot dead, along the road. Bolton suggests that Hesse was going to inform their commanding officer of Morant's plans to kill the prisoners and accuses Morant of ordering Handcock to silence him. Unmoved, Morant insists that his commanding officer already knew and suggests that he be recalled from India to testify. He adds, "I don't mind waiting".

After Morant stands down, Thomas requests and is granted a brief recess to confer with Handcock before putting him on the stand. Late into the night, Thomas pleads with Handcock to tell him the truth, calling the Hesse murder "the most serious charge". At last, Handcock opens up about his whereabouts. The following morning, Handcock testifies that, when he left Fort Edward, he had travelled to the homes of two married Afrikaner women to 'entertain' them. As Bolton eyes him, Thomas produces signed depositions from the women to confirm Handcock's story. The court and the prosecution accept the depositions without summoning the women to give evidence.

Later, in the prison courtyard, Witton wonders aloud about who really did kill Hesse. Handcock smiles and says, "Me". To Witton's horror, Handcock explains that his visits to his "two lady friends" happened afterwards. When Witton asks whether Thomas knows, Morant explains that there is no reason for him to know. Morant explains that the Bushveldt Carbineers represent a new kind of warfare "for a new century". As the Boers do not wear uniforms, the enemy is everyone, including men, women, children, even missionaries. That is why, after Hesse had left the Fort, Morant had told Handcock that he believed the Reverend was a Boer spy and had said he was going towards Leydsdorp. A seething Handcock replied that anything could happen on the way there, rode after Hesse, and shot him.

After a powerful summary speech by Thomas, the defendants are acquitted of murdering Hesse. They celebrate, believing they have escaped execution but Taylor takes Morant aside and tells him that he and Handcock are almost certainly going to be shot. He offers to have a horse ready and says that many of the Highland Scots guards are sympathetic. He urges Morant to flee to Portuguese Mozambique, take ship from Lourenço Marques, and "see the world". Unmoved, Morant replies, "I've seen it". Next morning, the defendants are all found guilty of murder and sentenced to death. Witton's sentence is commuted to "life in penal servitude". Thomas rushes to Kitchener's headquarters to demand a commutation and finds that Kitchener has already left. He is also told that London and the Australian Government support the verdict and sentences. There now will be a peace conference and every British and Colonial will be going home.

The next morning, as Witton is led away, Morant tells him "we are the scapegoats of Empire". Morant's poem "Butchered to Make a Dutchmen's Holiday" is recited in voiceover while he and Handcock are led before a firing squad. As both men are seated for their execution, Morant shouts, "Shoot straight, you bastards! Don't make a mess of it!" before being shot dead.

Cast

Production
Funding came from the SAFC, the Australian Film Commission, the Seven Network and PACT Productions. The distributors, Roadshow, insisted that Jack Thompson be given a role. The movie was the second of two films Beresford intended to make for the South Australian Film Corporation. He wanted to make Breakout, about the Cowra Breakout but could not find a script with which he was satisfied, so he turned to the story of Breaker Morant.

Historical inaccuracies

Alleged German pressure
In conversation with Bolton, Lord Kitchener states that Kaiser Wilhelm II has formally protested about the murder of Hesse, whom he describes as a German citizen. He says that the German people support the Boer cause, that their government covets the gold and diamond mines of the Boer Republics, and that the British Government fears German entry into the war. This, Kitchener explains, is why Morant, Handcock, and Witton must be convicted at all costs.

According to the South African historian Charles Leach, the legend that the German Foreign Office protested about the murder of Hesse "cannot be proved through official channels". "No personal or direct communication" between the Kaiser and his uncle, King Edward VII, "has been found despite widespread legend that this was definitely the case". Questions raised in the House of Commons on 8 April 1902 were answered by an insistence that the War Office, the Foreign Office, or Lord Kitchener had not received "any such communication on this subject" "on behalf of the German government".

Under international law, the German government had no grounds to protest. Despite being attached to the Berlin Missionary Society, Hesse had been born in Cape Colony and "was, technically speaking, a British subject, and not a German citizen". Yet, the scene contains a kernel of truth. Leach writes, "Several eminent South African historians, local enthusiasts, and commentators share the opinion that had it not been for the murder of Hesse, none of the other Bushveldt Carbineers would have been brought to trial".

Three defendants
Although only Morant, Handcock, and Witton are shown as being on trial, there were three other defendants:
 Lieutenant Henry Picton, a British-born Australian officer of the Bushveldt Carbineers, was charged along with Morant, Handcock, and Witton of "committing the offense of murder" for delivering a coup de grâce after the execution of the wounded prisoner Floris Visser. Picton was found guilty of manslaughter and sentenced to be cashiered from the British Armed Forces.
 Captain Alfred James Taylor, the Anglo-Irish commander of military intelligence at Fort Edward, stood accused of the murder of six unarmed Afrikaner men and boys, the theft of their money and livestock, and the subsequent murder of a Bushveldt Carbineers Trooper. He was acquitted.
 Major Robert Lenehan, the Australian Field Commander of the Bushveldt Carbineers, stood accused of concealing the murder of a Bushveldt Carbineers Trooper who had disapproved of shooting prisoners. The official charge was "When on active service by culpable neglect failing to make a report which it was duty to make". Lenehan was found guilty and sentenced to a reprimand.

Role of other ranks and Colonel Hall
The soldiers from the Fort Edward garrison who testify against Morant, Handcock and Witton are depicted as motivated by grudges against their former officers. A prime example is Corporal Sharp, who expresses a willingness to walk across South Africa to serve in the defendants' firing squad. Other prosecution witnesses have been thrown out of the Bushveldt Carbineers by the defendants for looting, drunkenness and other offences. All are portrayed with British accents.

Hall, the officer commanding at Pietersburg, is depicted as fully aware and even complicit in the total war tactics of the Fort Edward garrison. He is also described as having been sent to India to prevent him from giving testimony favourable to the defence. Surviving documents tell that the arrest of the six defendants was ordered by Hall after a letter from the other ranks at Fort Edward. The letter, dated 4 October 1901, was written by BVC Trooper Robert Mitchell Cochrane, a former Justice of the Peace from Western Australia and signed by 15 members of the Fort Edward garrison.

After listing numerous murders and attempted murders of unarmed Boer prisoners, local civilians and BVC personnel who disapproved, the letter concluded, "Sir, many of us are Australians who have fought throughout nearly the whole war while others are Afrikaners who have fought from Colenso till now. We cannot return home with the stigma of these crimes attached to our names. Therefore we humbly pray that a full and exhaustive inquiry be made by Imperial officers in order that the truth be elicited and justice done. Also we beg that all witnesses may be kept in camp at Pietersburg till the inquiry is finished. So deeply do we deplore the opprobrium which must be inseparably attached to these crimes that scarcely a man once his time is up can be prevailed to re-enlist in this corps. Trusting for the credit of thinking you will grant the inquiry we seek".

Arrest at Fort Edward
During his conversation with Handcock and Witton in the prison courtyard, Morant alleges that the British Army has marked them for death "ever since they arrested us at Fort Edward" but their arrests took place elsewhere. After the letter Hall summoned all Fort Edward officers and non-commissioned officers to Pietersburg on 21 October 1901. All were met by a party of mounted infantry five miles outside Pietersburg on the morning of 23 October 1901 and "brought into town like criminals". Morant was arrested after returning from leave in Pretoria, where he had gone to settle the affairs of his deceased friend Captain Hunt.

Rejection of deals for leniency
In the film, the British military is determined to kill the defendants. According to the Australian historians Margaret Carnegie and Frank Shields, Morant and Handcock rejected an offer of immunity from prosecution in return for turning king's evidence. Military prosecutors allegedly hoped to use them as witnesses against BVC Major Robert Lenehan, who was believed to have issued orders to take no prisoners. Towards the end of the film, Taylor informs Morant that the British Army will never dare to prosecute him, as he really can implicate Kitchener in war crimes. According to the South African historian Andries Pretorius, the trial of Alfred Taylor was almost certainly saved for the last because "The prosecution must have been hoping", in vain for the accused officers, "to implicate Taylor". Their refusal to do so seems to have ensured that Taylor was not convicted at his trial.

Captain Hunt
In the film, Hunt is inaccurately depicted as having an Australian accent. According to the South African historian Charles Leach, Captain Hunt "was an Englishman, a former Lieutenant in Kitchener's Fighting Scouts, and a fine horseman". A surviving photograph of Hunt also reveals that he was far younger than the actor who plays him on screen.

Witton's death date 
The movie states that Witton died in 1943. In reality, he died of complications after suffering a heart attack on 14 August 1942.

Critical response
Rotten Tomatoes gave Breaker Morant a 100% approval rating, based on 23 reviews, with an average score of 8.39/10.

The film also stirred debate on the legacy of the trial with its pacifist theme. D. L. Kershen wrote "Breaker Morant tells the story of the court martial of Harry Morant, Peter Handcock, and George Witton in South Africa in 1902. Yet, its overriding theme is that "war is evil". Breaker Morant is a beautiful antiwar statement — a plea for the end of the intrigues and crimes that war entails".

Another comments

Bruce Beresford claimed the film is often misunderstood as the story of men railroaded by the British,

After the success of Breaker Morant, Beresford was offered dozens of Hollywood scripts including Tender Mercies, which he later directed. The 1983 film earned him his only Academy Award nomination for Best Director to date, even though Driving Miss Daisy (1989) which he directed, won Best Picture. Beresford said that Breaker Morant was not that successful commercially,

Box office
Breaker Morant grossed A$4,735,000 at the box office in Australia, the equivalent of $19.7 million in 2017 dollars.

Awards

Soundtrack
A soundtrack was released by Cherry Pie Music (CPF 1046)

Charts

Home media
A DVD was released by REEL Corporation in 2001 with a running time of 104 minutes. Image Entertainment released a Blu-ray Disc version of the film in the US on 5 February 2008 (107 minutes), including the documentary "The Boer War", a detailed account of the historical facts depicted in the film. In 2015 the film was released by The Criterion Collection on both DVD and Blu-ray.

See also
 British war crimes
 Court martial of Breaker Morant
 Trial movies

References

Citations

General and cited references 
 
 Ross, K. G. (1979). Breaker Morant: A Play in Two Acts. Melbourne: Edward Arnold. .
  Written on the hundredth anniversary of Morant's execution and the twenty-fourth anniversary of the first performance of his play. Article was reprinted in The Sydney Morning Herald on the same date.

External links
 
 
 Breaker Morant, complete film on YouTube
 Breaker Morant: Scapegoats of Empire an essay by Neil Sinyard at the Criterion Collection
 "Kangaroo Court: On Bruce Beresford's 'Breaker Morant, Bright Lights Film Journal
 
 Breaker Morant at Australian Screen Online
 Breaker Morant at Oz Movies
 [https://web.archive.org/web/20090114224336/http://ftvdb.bfi.org.uk/sift/title/155066 Breaker Morant at the British Film Institute

1980 films
1980s biographical drama films
1980s historical drama films
1980s war drama films
Australian historical drama films
Australian war drama films
British Empire war films
Cultural depictions of Herbert Kitchener, 1st Earl Kitchener
Films about lawyers
Films about capital punishment
Films about war crimes trials
Australian films based on plays
Films based on works by Australian writers
Films directed by Bruce Beresford
Films set in 1901
Films set in 1902
Films set in South Africa
Films shot in Flinders Ranges
1980s legal films
Military courtroom films
Second Boer War films
War films based on actual events